Cleyera is a plant genus consisting of 21 species of tender, evergreen shrubs to small trees, mostly native to Mexico and Central America, and one from Eastern Asia. In the APG III system it is placed in the family Pentaphylacaceae.

The botanical name is derived from Andrew Cleyer, a Dutch physician of the seventeenth century. The plants are grown for specimen accent hedges or  mixed border landscapes. Though they are slow-growing, they can eventually reach 6–10 ft (1.8-3m). The plants grow densely upright with low spreading-branch habit, round-shaped form, and can be kept compact by occasionally tip-cutting. Leaves are glossy, oval-shaped, 6–10 cm long with dark-green and bronze-red to burgundy tinted young leaves. Very fragrant small creamy white to pale yellow flowers bloom in early summer with petals free or scarcely coalesced. The pollen can cause mild allergy symptoms. Fruits are spherical, greenish yellow, turning red to black.

Species
 Accepted species
 Cleyera albopunctata (Griseb.) Krug & Urb.
 Cleyera bolleana (O.C.Schmidt) Kobuski
 Cleyera cernua (Tul.) Kobuski
 Cleyera costaricensis Kobuski
 Cleyera cuspidata H.T.Chang & S.H.Shi 
 Cleyera ekmanii (O.C.Schmidt) Kobuski 
 Cleyera incornuta Y.C.Wu 
 Cleyera integrifolia (Benth.) Choisy 
 Cleyera japonica Thunb. (syn. Cleyera ochnacea) sakaki
 Cleyera longicarpa (Yamam.) L.K. Ling 
 Cleyera matudai Kobuski 
 Cleyera neibensis Alain
 Cleyera nimanimae (Tul.) Krug & Urb. 
 Cleyera obovata H.T.Chang 
 Cleyera obscurinervia (Merr. & Chun) H.T.Chang 
 Cleyera orbicularis Alain 
 Cleyera pachyphylla Chun ex H.T.Chang 
 Cleyera panamensis (Standl.) Kobuski 
 Cleyera revoluta Kobuski 
 Cleyera serrulata Choisy 
 Cleyera skutchii Kobuski 
 Cleyera tacanensis Kobuski 
 Cleyera ternstroemioides (O.C.Schmidt) Kobuski 
 Cleyera theoides (Sw.) Choisy 
 Cleyera vaccinioides (O.C.Schmidt) Kobuski 
 Cleyera velutina B.M.Barthol. 
 Cleyera yangchunensis L.K.Ling

 Unresolved species
 Cleyera dubia Champ. ex Benth.
 Cleyera fragrans Champ. ex Benth.
 Cleyera gymnanthera Wight & Arn.
 Cleyera millettii Hook. & Arn.
 Cleyera pentapetala Spreng.

 Names brought to synonymy
 Cleyera elegans, a synonym for Freziera undulata

References

Botanica Sistematica

Pentaphylacaceae
Ericales genera